TFR may refer to:

Biology and medicine 
 Total fertility rate
 Transferrin receptor

Economy 
 Texans for Fiscal Responsibility, US
 Thrift Financial Report

Engineering and physics 
 Temporary flight restriction, US
 Terrain-following radar, for military aircraft
 Time–frequency representation of a signal
 Tokamak de Fontenay aux Roses, 1970s tokamak in France
 Transnet Freight Rail, a South African rail transport company

Other 
 Task Force Ranger
 Isuzu Faster, truck named Isuzu TFR in Thailand